Huocheng County as the official romanized name, also transliterated from Uyghur as Korgas County, is situated within the Xinjiang Uyghur Autonomous Region and under the administration of the Ili Kazakh Autonomous Prefecture. Including the Han and Uyghur nationalities, there are twenty nine ethnic groups living in the county.

North of Huocheng County is Wenquan County; to the south lies the Ili River.

History
Within Huocheng County lies the important ruined site of ancient Almaliq. The mausoleum of the first khan of Moghulistan Tughlugh Timur is within the county as well.

In the 1760s, nine fortresses were built in the Ili River Basin and four of them were located within the modern Huocheng County. Huiyuan was the headquarter of the General of Ili and as such it was the military and administrative center of Xinjiang until the 1860s.

Suiding County was established in 1888 with Suiding as county seat. In 1914, the western area of Shuiding County was organized into Khorgas County, later abbreviated to Huocheng County, with Gongchen (Khorgas) as county seat. In 1965 Suiding was renamed Shuiding. In 1966, Shuiding County merged into Huocheng County with Shuiding as the county seat of the new Huocheng County. In 2014, Khorgas became a county-level city separate from Huocheng County.

Administrative divisions

The county includes five towns and four townships.

Towns:
 Shuiding / Süydüng (the county seat),
 Qingshuihe / Chingsixoza,
 Lucaogou / Losigung,
 Huiyuan / Küre,
 Sarbulaq (Sarbulaq)
Townships:
 Lengger,
 Sandixoza,
 Sengung,
 Dashigu

There are 5 towns in Huocheng County, which are as follows:

ئىزاھات:

There are 4 Township in Huocheng County, which are as follows:

Climate

Economy
In agriculture, the local population cultivate wheat, corn and other crops including sugar beet, cotton, tobacco, apples, animal husbandry with cattle and sheep.

The main minerals extracted in the area include coal, phosphorus, iron, gold, silver, copper, limestone, Iceland spar and marble, etc.

Transport
Huocheng is served by China National Highway 312 and the Jinghe-Yining-Khorgas Railway.

There is a border crossing into Kazakhstan at Khorgas, where the road continues to Zharkent in Panfilov District.

The Jinghe–Yining–Khorgas Railway through Huocheng county was completed in 2010, reaching practically to the Kazakhstan border. There are plans to construct a connecting railway line on the Kazakh side, creating China's second railway link to Central Asia besides Alashankou.

References

External links

 Huocheng County information, at the site of Ili Kazakh Autonomous Prefecture 
 County Map  
 Thoughts about the history of Yining City and Huocheng County (the writer's point of view on how the places should be called) 
 Henry Lansdell, "Russian Central Asia: Including Kuldja, Bokhara, Khiva and Merv", vol. I. Full text available at Google Books; there is also a 2001 facsimile reprint of the 1885 edition, . (Chapters XIV-XVI in Volume I describe Lansdell's visit to the area in the early 1880s, soon after the Russian withdrawal). 

County-level divisions of Xinjiang
Ili Kazakh Autonomous Prefecture